Jason L. Martin (born May 8, 1987), better known by his stage name Problem, is an American rapper, songwriter and record producer. He has released nineteen mixtapes in his career, the most recent being S2, released 2018. His debut EP, Understand Me, was released on December 10, 2013. He is best known for his single "Like Whaaat" and for featuring on E-40's "Function".

Early life 
Problem was born in Würzburg, West Germany and grew up in Compton, California. He entered the industry by writing a verse for producer Terrace Martin, for a song called "Be Thankful", featured on Snoop Dogg's compilation album The Big Squeeze. The track garnered praise from notable artist such as Nas and Talib Kweli amongst others. Problem began recording records with various West Coast artists such as Daz, Kurupt, Snoop Dogg, and DJ Quik. Problem's first big break was when Snoop Dogg heard a record which was also produced by Terrace Martin called "Neva Hafta To Wurry About That". He went on to write three records on Snoop Dogg's Ego Trippin' album.

Career
Prior to his career as a solo artist, Martin served as a ghostwriter in 2008, the first of which being the single "Head of My Class" by rapper Scooter Smiff featuring Chris Brown. He also made a guest appearance on fellow California artist Snoop Dogg's album, Malice N Wonderland.

Later that year, Problem launched the independent label, Diamond Lane Music Group. Then in 2009, he signed an unsuccessful two-single major label deal with Universal. However his breakout moment would be when he was featured on E-40's single "Function" along with YG (rapper) and Iamsu!. Since that time, Problem has worked with the various artists such as Jamie Foxx, Game, Kendrick Lamar, Bobby V, 9th Wonder, Chris Brown, Wiz Khalifa, Nipsey Hussle, Warren G, Childish Gambino, Pharrell Williams, Jim Jones, Travis Barker, and John Legend among many others. Over his career Problem has released seven mixtapes. On February 13, 2013, Problem released a collaborative mixtape with Iamsu! titled Million Dollar Afro with guest appearances from Juvenile, Too Short and Omarion.

On June 13, 2013, he released a mixtape titled The Separation with guest appearances from Wale, T.I., Snoop Dogg, Game, Chris Brown, Tank, Tyga and Wiz Khalifa among others. His 2013 song "Like Whaaat," featuring Bad Lucc, peaked at #20 on the Bubbling Under Hot 100 singles chart, becoming his most successful song. On July 23, 2013, he released "Say That Then," featuring Glasses Malone. “Say That Then” and “Do it Big” featuring Bad Lucc, Sage The Gemini, and Iamsu! were featured on the 2013 hit game Grand Theft Auto V by Rockstar Games on the fictional radio station “Radio Los Santos.”

In November 2013, Problem announced that he would release his debut album independently through Diamond Lane Music Group. He revealed that he would be primarily producing the album along with League of Starz. On December 10, 2013, Problem released a retail EP called Understand Me, featuring songs such as "Like Whaaat", "Say That Then" and "Understand Me". Problem appeared in a branded music video alongside Neil Patrick Harris for the drink product Neuro in February 2014.

Problem made a splash for his hometown city when he partnered with the Los Angeles Rams to create the team's theme song, "My Squad," for the 2016-17 NFL season. The release included an official music video that was shot to look like Snapchat.

After gaining much success on the mixtape circuit, Problem finally released his debut album, Selfish, in November 2017. The project showcases some of his most personal work yet. As well as he released his second album S2 in November 30, 2018.

On April 4, 2020, Problem released a short film titled "A Compton Story". The short film is narrated by comedian Mike Epps and has appearances from Snoop Dogg, Slink Johnson, and Jackie Long. Terrence "Punch" Henderson is credited as the executive producer on the project.

Influences 
His musical influences are Eminem, N.W.A, the Isley Brothers, Prince, Aaliyah, R. Kelly, Baby Bash, Lil Wayne, the Temptations, DJ Quik, the Jacksons, and the group DeBarge.

Discography 

Understand Me (2013)
Rosecrans EP  (with DJ Quik) (2016) 
 Hotels : 2 Suite Master(2017)
 Coffee & Kush, Vol. 2 (2020)
  Coffee & Kush Vol. 3 (TBA)
 The Separation 3 (TBA)

References

African-American male rappers
Living people
Rappers from Los Angeles
Musicians from Compton, California
West Coast hip hop musicians
1985 births
Gangsta rappers
21st-century American rappers
21st-century American male musicians
21st-century African-American musicians
20th-century African-American people